Prasanta Pradhan (born 14 December 1939) is an Indian politician for the Contai (Lok Sabha constituency) in West Bengal.

External links
 Official biographical sketch in Parliament of India website
 Another link

1939 births
Living people
Communist Party of India (Marxist) politicians from West Bengal
People from Purba Medinipur district
India MPs 2004–2009
Scottish Church College alumni
Lok Sabha members from West Bengal
Indian Gorkhas